Lee Seo-el is a South Korean actress and model. She is best known for her roles in dramas such as Rugal and Born Again.

Biography and career
Lee Seo-el is a South Korean model and actress. She was a model then she made her first acting debut in 2020 when she took on her first role in the television drama Rugal which attracted attention to her role as Yeo-jin and in the same year she was cast in drama Born Again as Baek Sang-ah.

Filmography

Television series

References

External links 
 
 
 

Year of birth missing (living people)
Living people
21st-century South Korean actresses
South Korean female models
South Korean television actresses